Manganaro may refer to:

Manganaro's
Aldo Manganaro, Italian athlete
Gabriele Manganaro, American engineer